Menne or Mennes is a surname that may refer to:

Menne
 Bob Menne (born 1942), American golfer
 Dave Menne (born 1974), American mixed martial arts fighter
 Peter Menne (born 1960), German production designer, stage designer, painter and musician
 Wilhelm Menne (1910–1945), German rower

Mennes
 John Mennes (1599–1671), English Naval officer
 Wim Mennes (born 1977), Belgium footballer